Karpiński (Polish feminine: Karpińska; plural: Karpińscy) is a surname. Notable people with the surname include the Karpiński family, a Polish noble family.

Related surnames

People

Karpinski, Karpinska 
 Alfons Karpiński (1875–1961), Polish portrait painter
 Louis Charles Karpinski (1878–1956), American mathematician
 Franciszek Karpiński (1741–1826), Polish poet and musical arranger
 Gene Karpinski (born 1952), American activist
 Jacek Karpiński (1927–2010), Polish computer engineer
 Janis Karpinski (born 1953), American army colonel, former general
 Louis Charles Karpinski (1878–1956), American mathematician and science historian
Lucjan Karpiński, Polish diplomat
 Ludwika Karpińska (1872–1937), Polish psychologist 
 Marek Karpinski (born 1948), Polish computer scientist and mathematician
 Marzena Karpińska (born 1988), Polish weightlifter
 Światopełk Karpiński (1909–1940), Polish poet
 Stefan Karpinski, American computer scientist
 Włodzimierz Witold Karpiński (born 1961), Polish politician
  (1906–1983), Polish architect

Karpinsky
 Alexander Karpinsky (1846–1936), Russian geologist
 Janice Karpinsky, character in 11/11/11

See also
 
 
 

Polish-language surnames